The Sandy Creek, a perennial stream of the Richmond River catchment, is located in Northern Rivers region in the state of New South Wales, Australia.

Location and features
The river flows generally east, north, east, and then south before reaching its confluence with the Richmond River near Bungawalbin, south of Coraki.

See also

 Rivers of New South Wales
 List of rivers of New South Wales (L-Z)
 List of rivers of Australia

References

External links
 

 

Northern Rivers
Rivers of New South Wales
Richmond Valley Council